Uravakonda Assembly constituency is a constituency of the Andhra Pradesh Legislative Assembly, India. It is one of 14 constituencies in the Anantapur district.

Overview
It is part of the Anantapur Lok Sabha constituency along with another six Vidhan Sabha segments, namely, Rayadurg, Guntakal, Tadpatri, Singanamala, Anantpur Urban and Kalyandurg in Anantapur district.

Mandals

Members of Legislative Assembly

Election results

Assembly Elections 2004

Assembly Elections 2009

Assembly elections 2014

Assembly elections 2019

References

Assembly constituencies of Andhra Pradesh